Arsun (also Romanized as Arsūn and Ārsūn; also known as Arsin and Arsown) is a village in Khanandabil-e Gharbi Rural District, in the Central District of Khalkhal County, Ardabil Province, Iran. At the 2006 census, its population was 123, in 35 families.

References 

Tageo

Towns and villages in Khalkhal County
Settled areas of Elburz